B. A. Brathwaite (born 1 January 1970) is a former Bermudian cricketer. Brathwaite's batting and bowling styles are unknown.

Brathwaite made his debut for Bermuda in a List A match against the Windward Islands in the 1996–97 Shell/Sandals Trophy, with him making three further List A appearances in that seasons tournament. He later further made two List A appearances in the 1998–99 Red Stripe Bowl against Trinidad and Tobago and the Windward Islands. He scored a total of 12 runs in his six matches, as well as taking three wickets from a total of 24 overs bowled.

References

External links

Living people
Bermudian cricketers
1970 births